Imam Uddin Ahmed is a Jatiya Party (Ershad) politician and the former Member of Parliament of Moulvibazar-1.

Early life
Ahmed was born into a Bengali Muslim family in Moulvibazar, Sylhet District.

Career
Ahmed stood up for the 1986 Bangladeshi general elections as a Jatiya Party candidate for the newly renamed Moulvibazar-1 (Barlekha-Juri) constituency. During the 1991 Bangladeshi general elections, he was an Awami League candidate and lost his seat to Ebadur Rahman Chowdhury.

References

Jatiya Party politicians
Living people
3rd Jatiya Sangsad members
Year of birth missing (living people)
People from Moulvibazar District